Patrick Brion Estes (born February 4, 1983 in Richmond, Virginia) is a former American football offensive tackle. He was originally drafted by the San Francisco 49ers in the seventh round of the 2005 NFL Draft. He played college football at Virginia. Currently Patrick is a regional Director for RMC Events (in Charlottesville, Virginia). He announced his  candidacy for the Democratic Nomination for Albemarle County Sheriff in February 2019.

High school career
Estes played high school football in Richmond, Virginia for the Benedictine Cadets. He also was a stand out basketball player there.

He played in the first ever U.S. Army All-American Bowl game on December 30, 2000.

College career
Estes, who was considered one of the top recruits in the country at tight end, spent his career as a backup to Virginia's All-American Heath Miller but received frequent playing time particularly as a blocker. Though he played as a tight end in college he was converted to offensive tackle by the 49ers.

Professional career

Career transactions
Released by the 49ers on September 5, 2007.
Signed by the 49ers on October 2, 2007.
Released by the 49ers on October 9, 2007.
Signed by the 49ers on November 8, 2007.
Released by the 49ers on December 18, 2007.
Claimed off waivers by the Buffalo Bills on December 19, 2007.
Released by the Buffalo Bills on August 30, 2008.

References

External links
ESPN Player Profile
Yahoo Player Profile

1983 births
Living people
Players of American football from Richmond, Virginia
American football offensive tackles
American football tight ends
Virginia Cavaliers football players
San Francisco 49ers players
Buffalo Bills players
Berlin Thunder players